Joseph Louis Krawczyk Jr. (born December 24, 1947) is a Republican politician who was elected and served in the Vermont House of Representatives. He represented the Bennington-2-1 Representative District but was defeated in 2010 by a Democrat, Brian Campion. His cousin, Albert Krawczyk, served in the House from 1999 to 2005.

References

External links
 Profile at Vote Smart

1947 births
Living people
People from Bennington, Vermont
Military personnel from Vermont
Colorado State University Pueblo alumni
Republican Party members of the Vermont House of Representatives